Aspergillus hortai is a species of fungus in the genus Aspergillus. It is from the Terrei section. The species was first described in 1935. It has been isolated from the ear of a human in Brazil, soil from the Galapagos Islands, and soil from the United States. It has been reported to produce acetylaranotin, butyrolactones, citrinin, 3-methylorsellinic acid, terrein, and terrequinone A.

Growth and morphology

A. hortai has been cultivated on both Czapek yeast extract agar (CYA) plates and Malt Extract Agar Oxoid® (MEAOX) plates. The growth morphology of the colonies can be seen in the pictures below.

References 

hortai
Fungi described in 1935
Fungi of the Galápagos Islands
Fungi of South America
Fungi of the United States
Fungi without expected TNC conservation status